Kasson-Mantorville High School (KMHS) is a high school located in Kasson, Minnesota, United States, that serves students from both Kasson and neighboring Mantorville. It is the only high school in Minnesota School District #204, and it is the home of the Kasson-Mantorville "KoMets", whose school colors are royal blue and white. The school's song is "KM Fight" and is sung to the tune "Washington and Lee Swing".

Extracurricular Activities
KMHS belongs to the Hiawatha Valley League Conference for all sports except football.  For football, KMHS belongs to the Southern Football Alliance-Red Division.  KMHS belongs to the Minnesota State High School League for tournament play.

KMHS participates in most sports offered by the Hiawatha Valley League: baseball, boys' and girls' basketball, dance team, football, golf, ice hockey, boys' and girls' soccer, softball, track and field, girls' volleyball, and wrestling.

KMHS offers band, choir, knowledge bowl, robotics, drama and cheerleading programs.

The drama program produces one fall musical, a one-act winter play, and one spring play.

Building

KM High School is one of three buildings within the KM campus which also includes a middle school and elementary school with a community education wing.  In the fall of 2017 a community approved expansion was completed that added a magnificent commons area, new classrooms for S.T.E.M. education, vocation tech, agriculture, industrial tech, music and consumer sciences.  Also a new auditorium, media center, kitchen and cafeteria and a Safe and Secure entrance. .

KH HS was previously the largest school in the area in which the middle and high schools shared a building. The middle school section, which held grades 7 and 8, had a capacity of approximately 300 students. The high school, grades 912, held approximately 600. The middle and high school programs also shared certain areas, such as art and FACS.  The building is now used solely for high school classes. A new middle school building for grades 58 opened for classes in September 2009.

The building contains two separate gymnasiums.

References

External links
Official Site
Unofficial Sports Website
Aerial Photo

Public high schools in Minnesota
Educational institutions established in 1956
Schools in Dodge County, Minnesota
1956 establishments in Minnesota